Shah Bolagh-e Bala (also Romanized as Shāh Bolāgh-e Bālā; also known as Shāh Bodāgh) is a village in Lajran Rural District, in the Central District of Garmsar County, Semnan Province, Iran. At the 2006 census, its population was 1,671, in 415 families.

References 

Populated places in Garmsar County